Diede de Groot and Aniek van Koot defeated Kgothatso Montjane and Lucy Shuker in the final, 6–4, 6–1 to win the women's doubles wheelchair tennis title at the 2021 Australian Open. With the win, de Groot completed the double career Grand Slam.

Yui Kamiji and Jordanne Whiley were the reigning champions, but Whiley did not participate. Kamiji partnered Momoko Ohtani, but was defeated in the semifinals by de Groot and van Koot.

Seeds

Draw

Bracket

References

External links
 Drawsheet on ausopen.com

Wheelchair Women's Doubles
2021 Women's Doubles